Barack Obama served as the 44th President of the United States from 2009 to 2017. Before his presidency, he served in the Illinois Senate (1997–2004) and the United States Senate (2005–2008).

It was during his campaign for the United States Senate that he first made a speech that received nationwide attention; he gave the keynote address at the 2004 Democratic National Convention. and stated "there is not a liberal America and a conservative America—there is the United States of America". Obama began to run for president just three years after that speech. In response to a political controversy involving race during the primary campaign, he delivered his "A More Perfect Union" speech, which was widely seen as a critical point in the campaign.

Obama won election to the presidency in 2009 and re-election in 2013. Among the hundreds of speeches he has delivered since then include six speeches before Congress (including four State of the Union addresses), two victory speeches, a speech to the Islamic world in Egypt early in his first term, and a speech following the shooting of Congresswoman Gabby Giffords.

On January 10, 2017, We Are The Change We Seek, a collection of Barack Obama's greatest speeches selected and introduced by columnist E.J. Dionne and MSNBC host Joy-Ann Reid was published by Bloomsbury Publishing.

Democratic National Convention keynote address, 2004

The keynote address at the 2004 Democratic National Convention (DNC) was given by then Illinois State Senator, United States Senate candidate, and future President Barack Obama on the night of Tuesday, July 27, 2004. His unexpected landslide victory in the March 2004 Illinois U.S. Senate Democratic primary had made him overnight a rising star within the national Democratic Party, started speculation about a presidential future, and led to the reissue of his memoir, Dreams from My Father. His convention keynote address was well received, which further elevated his status within the Democratic Party and led to his reissued memoir becoming a bestseller.

Obama first met Democratic presidential candidate John Kerry in the spring of 2004, and was just one of several names considered for the role of keynote speaker at the party's convention that summer. After being alerted in early July that he had been chosen to deliver the address, Obama largely wrote the speech himself, with later edits from the Kerry presidential campaign. Delivered on the second night of the DNC in just under 20 minutes, the address included both a biographical sketch of Obama, his own vision of America, and the reasons for his support of Kerry for the presidency. Unlike almost all prior and all subsequent convention keynote addresses, it was not televised by the commercial broadcast networks, and was only seen by a combined PBS, cable news and C-SPAN television audience of about 9 million. Since its delivery, several academics have studied the speech, both for the various narratives it describes as well as its implications for racial reconciliation.

A More Perfect Union, 2008

"A More Perfect Union" is the name of a speech delivered by Senator Barack Obama on March 18, 2008 in the course of the contest for the 2008 Democratic Party presidential nomination. Speaking before an audience at the National Constitution Center in Philadelphia, Obama was responding to a spike in the attention paid to controversial remarks made by the Reverend Jeremiah Wright, his former pastor and, until shortly before the speech, a participant in his campaign. Obama framed his response in terms of the broader issue of race in the United States. The speech's title was taken from the Preamble to the United States Constitution.

Obama addressed the subjects of racial tensions, white privilege, and race and inequality in the United States, discussing black "anger", white "resentment", and other issues as he sought to explain and contextualize Wright's controversial comments.  His speech closed with a plea to move beyond America's "racial stalemate" and address shared social problems.

On March 27, 2008, the Pew Research Center called the speech "arguably the biggest political event of the campaign so far," noting that 85 percent of Americans said they had heard at least a little about the speech and that 54 percent said they heard a lot about it.  The New Yorker opined that the speech helped elect Obama as the President of the United States.

Election victory speech, 2008

Following his victory in the 2008 United States presidential election, President-elect Barack Obama gave his victory speech at Grant Park in his home city of Chicago, on November 4, 2008, before an estimated crowd of 240,000. Viewed on television and the Internet by millions of people around the globe, Obama's speech focused on the major issues facing the United States and the world, all echoed through his campaign slogan of change. He also mentioned his grandmother, who had died two nights earlier.

Speech to joint session of Congress, 2009

United States President Barack Obama delivered a speech to a joint session of the 111th United States Congress on February 24, 2009. It was not an official State of the Union address. Obama's first State of the Union Address was the 2010 State of the Union Address. The speech was delivered on the floor of the chamber of the United States House of Representatives in the United States Capitol. Presiding over this joint session was the House Speaker, Nancy Pelosi. Accompanying the Speaker of the House was the President of the United States Senate, Joe Biden, the Vice President of the United States.

President Obama discussed the recently passed $787 billion American Recovery and Reinvestment Act of 2009 as well as the Troubled Assets Relief Program, the state of the economy, and the future of the country.

Attorney General Eric Holder was the designated survivor and did not attend the address in order to maintain a continuity of government. He was sequestered at a secret secure location for the duration of the event.

A New Beginning, 2009 

"A New Beginning" is the name of a speech delivered by United States President Barack Obama on June 4, 2009, from the Major Reception Hall at Cairo University in Egypt. Al-Azhar University co-hosted the event. The speech honors a promise Obama made during his presidential campaign to give a major address to Muslims from a Muslim capital during his first few months as president.

White House Press Secretary Robert Gibbs indicated that Egypt was chosen because "it is a country that in many ways represents the heart of the Arab world." Egypt is considered a key player in the Middle East peace process as well as a major recipient of American military and economic aid. Reuters reporter Ross Colvin reported that the speech would attempt to mend the United States' relations with the Muslim world, which he wrote were "severely damaged" during the presidency of George W. Bush.

Speech to joint session of Congress, 2009

United States President Barack Obama discussed his plan for health care reform in a speech delivered to a joint session of the 111th United States Congress on September 9, 2009 at 8:00 PM (EDT).  The speech was delivered to Congress on the floor of the chamber of the United States House of Representatives in the United States Capitol. House Speaker Nancy Pelosi presided over the joint session and was accompanied by the President of the United States Senate, Joe Biden, the Vice President of the United States. Energy Secretary Steven Chu was chosen as the designated survivor and did not attend the speech.

State of the Union Address, 2010 

The 2010 State of the Union Address was given by United States President Barack Obama on January 27, 2010, to a joint session of Congress. It was aired on all the major networks starting at 9 pm ET. It was Obama's first State of the Union Address, though the president did give a non-State of the Union address to a joint session of Congress a month after taking office in 2009.

The speech was delivered in the United States House of Representatives in the United States Capitol. As always, the presiding officers of the Senate and the House of Representatives, Vice President Joe Biden (as Senate President) and House Speaker Nancy Pelosi sat behind the president.

The theme for President Obama's speech was "Rescue, Rebuild, Restore – a New Foundation for Prosperity". Among the topics that Obama covered in his speech were proposals for job creation and federal deficit reduction.

Newly inaugurated Virginia Governor Bob McDonnell delivered the Republican response following the speech from the floor of the House of Delegates at the Virginia State Capitol in front of over 300 people.

Space policy speech at Kennedy Space Center, 2009

This speech was delivered on April 15, 2010, at the Kennedy Space Center.

Birth Certificate statement, 2011 
Obama delivered a speech at the White House Briefing Room on April 20, 2011. He stated that the release of his birth certificate is a settled issue saying that the American people "didn't care" nor were concerned about this.  Obama blamed partisan politics and said this release is no different than any earlier release.

Tucson memorial speech, 2011 

President of the United States Barack Obama delivered a speech at the Together We Thrive: Tucson and America memorial on January 12, 2011, held in the McKale Center on the University of Arizona campus.

It honored the victims of the 2011 Tucson shooting and included themes of healing and national unity. Watched by more than 30 million Americans, it drew widespread praise from politicians and commentators across the political spectrum and from abroad.

State of the Union Address, 2011 

The 2011 State of the Union Address was a speech given by President Barack Obama at 9 p.m. EST on January 25, 2011, in the chamber of the United States House of Representatives. In this joint session Obama outlined his "vision for an America that's more determined, more competitive, better positioned for the future—an America where we out-innovate, we out-educate, we out-build the rest of the world; where we take responsibility for our deficits; where we reform our government to meet the demands of a new age."

Speech to joint session of Congress, 2011

State of the Union Address, 2012 

The 2012 State of the Union Address was a speech given by former President Barack Obama, from 9 p.m. to 10:17 p.m. EST on Tuesday, January 24, 2012, in the chamber of the United States House of Representatives. In his speech, he focused on education reform, repairing America's infrastructure with money not used on the Iraq War, and creating new energy sources in America.

Speech to the Clinton Global Initiative, 2012 
Barack Obama's speech to the Clinton Global Initiative in 2012 took place on September 25. The speech was on the subject of human trafficking, which Obama referred to as "modern slavery". He stated that he did not use the term "slavery" lightly, knowing that this word conjures painful memories of previous forms of slavery in the United States. In the speech, he told his administration to oppose human trafficking to a greater extent than the administration had done previously. He also encouraged people to develop technology to combat human trafficking, and specifically put a call out to college students. He also told the story of former human trafficking victim Sheila White, who, in 2003, was battered next to the Port Authority of New York and New Jersey without anyone even asking her if she needed help. Opening night of the human-trafficking-themed Canadian play She Has a Name in Edmonton, Alberta coincided with Obama's speech. JD Supra called it a "landmark speech [that] is reflective of the fact that human trafficking and forced labor have become key priorities" for people wishing to address the human rights issues that result from business operations. California Against Slavery founder Daphne Phung was pleased with Obama's speech. As part of the Obama administration's followup to the speech to the Clinton Global Initiative, there was a 25-person discussion at the White House about how to eliminate human trafficking globally.

"You didn't build that", 2012  

The speech took place in Roanoke, Virginia, on July 13, 2012.

"Trayvon Martin could have been me 35 years ago", 2013 

On July 19, 2013, President Obama gave a speech in place of the usual White House daily briefing normally given by White House Press Secretary Jay Carney. In the 17-minute speech, President Obama spoke about public reaction to the conclusion of the George Zimmerman trial, racial profiling, and the state of race relations in the United States. The speech was widely covered on news networks, and made headlines across the country. During this speech, made six days after George Zimmerman was found not guilty, Obama said, "Trayvon Martin could have been me 35 years ago." That phrase became the most frequently quoted portion of the speech in the news cycle that followed. The speech marked a major turning point for Barack Obama, who had previously shied away from addressing issues of racial tension during his presidency. During the remarks, President Obama spoke about the many African-Americans who have experienced racial profiling, including himself.

President Obama also spoke about stand-your-ground laws and pondered that, if Trayvon Martin had been armed, he might possibly have legally stood his ground on the sidewalk and shot George Zimmerman because he felt threatened. Based on that ambiguity, Obama said that perhaps such laws should be examined.

Speech at the Brandenburg Gate Berlin, 2013

Speech at the Lincoln Memorial Reflecting Pool, 2013 

On August 28, 2013, the 50th anniversary of the March on Washington for Jobs and Freedom and Martin Luther King Jr.'s "I Have A Dream" speech was commemorated by an all day event featuring various speakers including President Barack Obama and John Lewis, the only speaker from the original rally to remain living.

State of the Union Address, 2013

State of the Union Address, 2014

State of the Union Address, 2015

Selma Anniversary, 2015 
Obama spoke on the 50th anniversary of the Selma to Montgomery Marches, lauded unsung heroes and everyday Americans that stood up for justice. According to leading George W. Bush speechwriter Michael Gerson, the speech "falls into the category of speeches that every child should read in school" and is cited by the Washington Post as the Obama speech which will hold up best for posterity.

Eulogy for Clementa Pinckney, 2015 
After the Charleston church shooting, during which state senator Clementa C. Pinckney and eight other victims were gunned down by a white supremacist, Obama went to the College of Charleston to deliver eulogy for senator Pinckney while addressing bigger issues about race relations and civil rights in the United States. Speech had Obama singing "Amazing grace" with the emotional crowd. A part of this song in speech was sampled by British band Coldplay in their album "A Head Full of Dreams".

Address to the Nation by the President, 2015 
On December 6, 2015, after a terrorist attack on San Bernardino, California, Obama delivered a live Address to the Nation by the President from the Oval Office. In the address, he declared the shooting an act of terrorism, referring to the shooters as having "gone down the dark path of radicalization" and embracing a "perverted version of Islam." Obama said that "the threat from terrorism is real, but we will overcome it" and promised that the United States will "destroy ISIL and any other organization that tries to harm us." Obama also outlined the ongoing fight against ISIL (including U.S. airstrikes, financial sanctions, and targeted special operations) and urged Americans to not give in to fear. It was just the third speech from the Oval Office in the seven years of Obama's presidency.

State of the Union Address, 2016

Hiroshima Speech, 2016 
On May 27, 2016 Obama became the first sitting US President to visit Hiroshima, bombed by the US in 1945. He made a speech at the Hiroshima Peace Park to a small audience of around 100 people, including hibakusha, (atomic bomb survivors). His speech was followed by one by Japanese Prime Minister Shinzō Abe.

Democratic National Convention, 2016 

In one of the last major speeches of his presidency, Obama strongly endorsed Clinton as the Democratic nominee for president, saying "there has never been a man or woman more qualified than Hillary Clinton. Not me, not Bill, nobody!" Obama contrasted his and Clinton's hopeful view of America with that of Republican nominee Donald Trump, which he called "deeply pessimistic." Obama argued that Trump was unqualified for the office, and was attempting to use fear to get elected. Michael Grunwald of Politico called it a "stirring but fundamentally defensive speech." Conservative blogger Erick Erickson tweeted "I disagree with the President on so much policy and his agenda, but appreciate the hope and optimism in this speech." After the speech, Clinton appeared on the stage for the first time in the convention, embracing her 2008 primary rival.

Hillary Clinton Presidential Campaign speeches, 2016 

Barack Obama gave eighteen speeches on behalf of the Clinton Campaign, many of which were in battleground states, such as North Carolina and New Hampshire. His last speech on behalf of the campaign was delivered at a rally at Independence Hall in Philadelphia on the eve of Election Day on November 7, 2016.

Farewell Speech, 2017 

Barack Obama gave a farewell speech, stating many achievements made during his presidency and thanking the American people for their hard work they had done and would continue to do.

H.B.C.U. Commencement speech, 2020
On May 16, 2020, Obama gave a virtual commencement speech for some 27,000 students from 78 historically black colleges and universities (HBCU). He said, "You've got more tools, technology, and talents than my generation did. No generation has been better positioned to be warriors for justice and remake the world."

Notes

References

Further reading
 Baysha, Olga. "Synecdoche that kills: How Barack Obama and Vladimir Putin constructed different Ukraines for different ends." International Communication Gazette 80.3 (2018): 230-249.
 Belisle, Jordan, et al. "Feasibility of contextual behavioral speech analyses of US presidents: Inaugural addresses of Bill Clinton, George W. Bush, Barack Obama, and Donald Trump, 1993–2017." Journal of Contextual Behavioral Science 10 (2018): 14-18.
 Bostdorff, Denise M. "Obama, Trump, and reflections on the rhetoric of political change." Rhetoric & Public Affairs 20.4 (2017): 695-706. online
 Degani, Marta. Framing the rhetoric of a leader: an analysis of Obama's election campaign speeches (Springer, 2015).
 Gleason, Timothy R., and Sara S. Hansen. "Image control: The visual rhetoric of President Obama." Howard Journal of Communications 28.1 (2017): 55-71. online
 Hill, Theon E. "Sanitizing the struggle: Barack Obama, Selma, and civil rights memory." Communication Quarterly 65.3 (2017): 354-376. online
 Holliday, N. "'My Presiden(t) and Firs(t) Lady Were Black': Style, Context, and Coronal Stop Deletion in the Speech of Barack and Michelle Obama." American Speech: A Quarterly of Linguistic Usage (2017) 92(4), 459-486, https://doi.org/10.1215/00031283-6903954
 Holliday, Nicole, Jason Bishop, and Grace Kuo. "Prosody and political style: The case of Barack Obama and the L+ H* Pitch accent." Proceedings of the 10th International Conference on Speech Prosody 2020. online
 Iversen, Stefan, and Henrik Skov Nielsen. "Invention as intervention in the rhetoric of Barack Obama." Storyworlds: A Journal of Narrative Studies 9.1-2 (2017): 121-142.
 Kurtz, Jeffrey B. "'To Have Your Experience Denied... it Hurts': Barack Obama, James Baldwin, and the Politics of Black Anger." Howard Journal of Communications 28.1 (2017): 93-106.
 Perry, Samuel. "Barack Obama, civil mourning, and prudence in presidential rhetoric." Howard Journal of Communications 28.2 (2017): 160-173 online.
 St. Onge, Jeffrey. "Neoliberalism as common sense in Barack Obama's health care rhetoric." Rhetoric Society Quarterly 47.4 (2017): 295-312. online
 Widiatmika, Putu Wahyu, I. Made Budiarsa, and I. Gde Sadia. "Rhetorical Schemes in Barack Obama's Winning Speech." Humanis 24.4: 394-401. online

Editions
 Dionne Jr, E. J., and Joy-Ann Reid, eds. We are the change we seek: The speeches of Barack Obama (Bloomsbury Publishing USA, 2017).

External links
 ObamaSpeeches.com
 Speeches in Text, Audio, Video at AmericanRhetoric.com

Articles containing video clips
Obama